Hearts of Humanity may refer to:

 Hearts of Humanity (1932 film), 1932 American drama film directed by Christy Cabanne
 Hearts of Humanity (1936 film), 1936 British drama film directed by John Baxter

See also
 The Heart of Humanity, 1918 silent war propaganda film